Jamides elpis, the glistening cerulean, is a butterfly in the family Lycaenidae. It was described by Jean Baptiste Godart in 1824. It is found in the Indomalayan realm.

The larvae feed on Lepisanthes, Boesenbergia and Elettaria species.

Subspecies
 Jamides elpis elpis (western Java)
 Jamides elpis sydra (Fruhstorfer, 1916) (eastern Java)
 Jamides elpis baweana (Fruhstorfer, 1916) (Bawean)
 Jamides elpis gerra (Fruhstorfer, 1916) (Palawan)
 Jamides elpis pseudelpis (Butler, 1879) (Burma, Thailand to Singapore)
 Jamides elpis saunda (Fruhstorfer, 1916) (Obi)
 Jamides elpis comeda (Fruhstorfer, 1916) (Tanahdjampea)

References

External links

Jamides at Markku Savela's Lepidoptera and Some Other Life Forms

Jamides
Butterflies described in 1824